"It is time to work for the Lord" is the first half of a verse in Psalms that has served as a dramatic slogan at several junctures in rabbinic Judaism.

Psalm 119:126 states: "It is time for the Lord to act, for your law has been broken" (New Oxford Annotated Bible ad loc.;  Eth la'asot Yahweh he-feru Toratekha). This verse would seem to suggest that, when the wicked are breaking the commandments, God will deliver the steadfast.

However, in the readings of rabbinic midrash, an alternate meaning of the verse is given, due to an ambiguity in the Biblical Hebrew: instead of God acting in response to sin, humans should act on behalf of God. Thus, the verse may be understood as: "It is time to work for the Lord..."

History
In the tannaitic period, the sage Hillel the Elder cited the verse to call fellow Jews to intensively study the Torah when it is neglected. (Ephraim Urbach interprets Hillel as calling for fuller observance of the Torah commandments in general, The Sages pp. 341f.) Rabbi Nathan makes a related gesture, for Jewish efforts against heresy, at the end of Mishnah Berakhot. Nathan transposes the two halves of the verse thus: "They have made void your law, it is time to work for the Lord." (See Urbach, 836n.93)

In the Talmudic period, the verse is thus called upon to justify the radical shift in rabbinic belief after the destruction of the Temple. Due to the conditions of exilic Jewry, the rabbinic leadership decided to permit the Oral Torah to be transcribed in writing and disseminated. The verse is interpreted to mean that "It is better that one letter of the Torah [the verse forbidding the writing down of the Oral Torah] should be uprooted than that the whole of the Torah be forgotten." (Temurah 14b, Elon Jewish Law 5:1, Louis Jacobs, p. 133 trans.)

In the modern period, the dramatic character of the verse again enters the stage. The verse is among those utilized to justify rabbinic innovations in halakhah. In Enlightenment period Germany, both the Reform rabbis and their Orthodox opponents cite the verse to justify the urgent nature of their actions ("It is time to act for the Lord"). The two conflicting positions see quite different referents for the verse's "they have voided the law"—the Reformers felt the need to accommodate the growing disinterest in Jewish law, whereas the Orthodox felt that the Reformers themselves were voiding the law.

See also
Psalm 119

References

Sources 

On the baraita of Hillel the Elder, see Tosefta Berakhot 6:24 and Lieberman ad loc.
Talmud Berakhot 63
Nathan Birnbaum, “Et la’asot,” //trans: "It is time to work (for the Lord)"  // in Nathan Birnbaum, ed., Divrei ha-olim (Vienna, 1917)
Elon. Jewish law
Jacobs. A Tree of Life: Diversity, Flexibility, and Creativity in Jewish Law
Urbach. The Sages

Other uses:

Ra'avad on Maimonides (H. Mamrim 2:9) 
Jacob Emden's responsum on concubinage also relies on the verse.
Franz Rosenzweig uses the verse in his public letter to Hermann Cohen, It is Time: Thoughts on the Problem of Jewish Education at this Moment (Berlin, 1917) //Zeit ists (German) Et la'asot (Hebrew)

Other uses:

In an aggadic midrash, the cock sings the verse as a call to work. Ginsburg, Legends of the Jews, I:3
There is an Israeli periodical named after this verse, Et la'asot //trans: "It is time to work (for the Lord)"

Jewish law principles
Hebrew Bible words and phrases
Psalms